Royal Oaks Park is a 122-acre county park in Monterey County, California.

History
The park was created by the County board of Supervisors in 1966. It was the County's first park.

Features
The park offers a softball field, tennis, basketball, and volleyball courts, a and a playground.

References

Parks in Monterey County, California
Nature reserves in California
Regional parks in California